Midkiff may refer to:

Locations
Midkiff, Texas
Midkiff, West Virginia
Midkiff Rock, rock outcrop in Antarctica

Legal case
Hawaii Housing Authority v. Midkiff

People with the surname
Dale Midkiff (born 1959), American actor
Dick Midkiff (1914–1956), American baseball player
Ezra Midkiff (1882–1957), American baseball player
Frank E. Midkiff (1887–1983), American educator and civic leader

Pets
Midkiff Seductive (born 1917), show dog